Donald Douglas Stringer (6 October 1928 – 26 March 2007) was a British fencer. He competed in the team sabre event at the 1960 Summer Olympics.

References

1928 births
2007 deaths
British male fencers
Olympic fencers of Great Britain
Fencers at the 1960 Summer Olympics
Sportspeople from London